In mathematics, the Mostow–Palais theorem is an equivariant version of the Whitney embedding theorem. It states that if a manifold is acted on by a compact Lie group with finitely many orbit types, then it can be embedded into some finite-dimensional orthogonal representation.

References

Lie groups
Theorems in topology